The 2008 Wisconsin Democratic presidential primary took place on February 19, 2008. 74 pledged delegates were at stake. The 2008 Hawaii Democratic presidential caucuses took place the same day.

The Wisconsin primary came after Senator Barack Obama had won the majority of delegates and votes in 8 straight primaries and caucuses; his wins in Wisconsin, and Hawaii extended his winning streak to 10 and reinforced his front-runner status.

In the days leading up to the primary the Hillary Clinton campaign ran television ads criticizing Obama on healthcare and for not agreeing to more candidate debates. This caused the Obama campaign to launch a response ad that mentioned the 18 debates already held and 2 more scheduled. The Clinton campaign also charged Obama using lines in a speech similar to words spoken by Massachusetts Governor and Obama friend Deval Patrick; Patrick responded by saying he and Obama often swap ideas, and that he had willingly shared lines without asking for credit to be given.  Barack Obama was the winner.

Polls

Polls taken throughout 2007 consistently put Hillary Clinton in the lead, but during February 2008 most polls showed Barack Obama with the advantage. A Rasmussen poll taken February 13 reported that almost one-fourth of those polled said there was a good chance they might change their mind.  It also found that while Clinton was doing well among women, with a 10-point advantage over Obama, Obama was polling 23 points higher than her among men.

Results

Analysis
In the weeks and days leading up to the Wisconsin Democratic Primary, most pundits agreed that it was  Hillary Clinton's chance to halt Obama's momentum after winning contests in Washington, Louisiana, Nebraska, Virginia, Maryland, Washington, D.C. following Super Tuesday.

Hillary Clinton enjoyed healthy leads among white voters in previous states and hoped that winning Wisconsin or at least the white vote would allow for a victory of sorts. However, CNN Exit Polls showed that Obama won the white vote (which comprised 87% of the electorate on primary day) 54%-45%. Also, other key Clinton constituencies showed Obama making significant strides such as the female vote which split 50%-50%, the 54-65 Age Group which voted for Obama 54%-45%.

After the victory in Wisconsin as well as Caucuses in Washington and a primary in Hawaii held on the same day gave Obama the momentum of winning 10 straight contests.  The Pledged delegate standing after the Wisconsin Primary was Obama leading 1154-1011.

See also
 2008 Democratic Party presidential primaries
 2008 Wisconsin Republican presidential primary

References

Wisconsin
2008 Wisconsin elections
2008
February 2008 events in the United States